Edgardo Carlos Suárez Mallagray is a Salvadorian diplomat and is the current Ambassador of El Salvador to Russia, presenting his credentials to Russian President Vladimir Putin on 27 July 2007.

References

Living people
Ambassadors of El Salvador to Russia
Salvadoran diplomats
Year of birth missing (living people)